Eugenia Popa (born September 10, 1973 in Bucharest, Romania) is a retired Romanian artistic gymnast. She won two world championship medals with the team: a silver medal in 1989 and a bronze medal in 1991. She was  an alternate to the 1992 silver winning Romanian Olympic team. After retirement she became a coach of artistic gymnastics. She currently coaches at Salto Gymnastics Centre in Lisburn, Northern Ireland.

References

External links
Gymnastics Greats: Whatever happened to Eugenia Popa?

Living people
Gymnasts from Bucharest
Romanian female artistic gymnasts
Medalists at the World Artistic Gymnastics Championships
1973 births
20th-century Romanian women